Prince of Darkness is the fourth album by rapper Big Daddy Kane, released in 1991 on Cold Chillin' Records. The album features guest appearances from Q-Tip and Busta Rhymes, and features the singles "Groove with It", "Raw ’91" and "The Lover in You".

Critical reception
The Rolling Stone Album Guide wrote that "Kane changes his style with Prince of Darkness, on some tracks augmenting his usually measured delivery with bursts of tongue-tripping wordplay."

Track listing

Album singles

Samples

"Ooh, Aah, Nah-Nah-Nah"
"Get Off" by Foxy (band)
"Brother, Brother"
"Get Out of My Life, Woman" by Lee Dorsey
"Rockin' Chair" by Gwen McCrae
"Playing Your Game, Baby" by Barry White
"Come On Down"
"Burnin' Bridges" by Lalo Schifrin
"Death Sentence"
"Good Ole Music" by Funkadelic
"The Easiest Way to Fall" by Freda Payne
"Get Bizzy"
"Da Doo Run Run" by The Crystals
"Ain't No Sunshine" by Bill Withers
"Give Me Your Love (Love Song)" by Curtis Mayfield
"Misdemeanor" by Foster Sylvers
"One Man Band (Plays All Alone) by Monk Higgins
"Get Down"
"I Got Ants In My Pants" by James Brown
"The Big Beat" by Billy Squier
"Atomic Dog" by George Clinton
"Prince Of Darkness"
"Be Alright" by Zapp
"Round and Round" by Tevin Campbell
"Raw '91"
"Good to Me" by Otis Redding
"Raw" by Big Daddy Kane
"Rebel Without A Pause" by Public Enemy
"The Lover In You"
"Pop Life" by Prince and The Revolution
"Hanging on a String" by Loose Ends

Charts

Weekly charts

Year-end charts

Singles

References

Big Daddy Kane albums
1991 albums
Cold Chillin' Records albums
Albums produced by Big Daddy Kane